The Hilton Austin Hotel is the third largest hotel in Austin, with 801 rooms.
Designed by Ellerbe Becket Inc and Susman Tisdale Gayle Architects (now STG Design, Inc), the building broke ground on July 10, 2001, and topped out officially on January 17, 2003, a span of 1 year, 6 months, and 7 days. In 2018, a $7.5 million overhead walkway was constructed to connect the sixth floor of the hotel with the fourth floor of the Austin Convention Center.

The tower began an exterior renovation in early 2018. The tower's sand-colored facade was painted white, with black paint added between windows.

See also
List of tallest buildings in Austin, Texas
List of tallest buildings in Texas
List of tallest buildings in the United States

References

Hotel buildings completed in 2003
Austin
Skyscraper hotels in Austin, Texas
2003 establishments in Texas